Wallace “Bucky” Williams (December 15, 1906 – November 16, 2009) was a Negro league baseball player and, at the time of his death, the second oldest living former Negro league player behind 104-year-old Emilio Navarro. Williams was a team member for the Pittsburgh Crawfords (1927–1932) and Homestead Grays in 1936. He was known to play earlier with the Pittsburgh Monarchs.

He was born in Baltimore, Maryland, a son to Joseph and Mathilda Williams. At the age of six months he moved to Pittsburgh and was a member of St. Charles Lwanga Parish in Pittsburgh's East End. His wife, Marjorie, whom he married in 1936, died in 1976.

Williams worked after his Negro leagues playing days with the Edgar Thomson Steel Works of U.S. Steel in Braddock, Pennsylvania, where he played ball. He is an honorary member of the Negro League Hall of Fame. In 1995, he traveled to Kansas City for a gathering of Negro leagues players. To celebrate his 100th birthday a party was held December 16, 2006 at the Churchill Country Club that was attended by family, friends and local community members.

Williams died one month before his 103rd birthday, on November 16, 2009. He is interred in Calvary Cemetery in the Pittsburgh's Hazelwood neighborhood.

External links
 and Seamheads
Article about Wallace "Bucky" Williams in 2004
Article mentioning Wallace "Bucky" Williams - June 27, 2006
Article about "Bucky" Williams July 9. 2006
Bucky Williams' obituary

1906 births
2009 deaths
Burials at Calvary Catholic Cemetery (Pittsburgh)
Pittsburgh Crawfords players
American centenarians
Men centenarians
Baseball players from Pittsburgh
Baseball players from Baltimore
Baseball infielders
20th-century African-American sportspeople
21st-century African-American people